Jigyaasa, released on 10 March 2006, is an Indian Hindi-language movie starring Hrishitaa Bhatt. The movie is directed by Faisal Saif. It was called the year's most controversial feature film, and was rumored to be based on the life of Indian actress, item girl and sex symbol Mallika Sherawat. Bhatt's performance in the film was praised by critics.

Small time Marathi actress Teja Deokar played Hrishitaa Bhatt's part in the recent unofficial remake in Marathi titled Nati, which means 'Actress'.

Plot 
Based on actual events, the film tells the story of an innocent girl named Jigyaasa Mathur (Hrishitaa Bhatt) who comes from a middle-class family, the daughter of a school teacher named Malini Mathur (Varsha Usgaonkar). Malini is a woman with principles and emotions. Jigyaasa wants to become a film actress and her mother has no objections about it. But Jigyaasa has some other plans. Jigyaasa will go to any limits to reach her goal. Within a timespan of five years, Jigyaasa reaches the top and becomes India's highest paid superstar.

Cast 
 Hrishitaa Bhatt as Jigyaasa Mathur
 Varsha Usgaonkar as Malini Mathur
 Kader Khan as Nand Kishore
 Milind Gunaji as Subhash Desai
 Vikas Kalantri as Avinash Chopra
 Jaya Bhattacharya as Neha Sharma
 Mukesh Tiwari a Ksamaal Hussain
 Rakesh Bedi as Ashok Kumar Shaayar (the gay activist)
 Anupam Shyam as Haider Bhai
 Divya Dwivedi as Monisha Singh

Music
Baaton Hi Baaton Mein - Udit Narayan, Sadhana Sargam
Jigyaasa - Ram Shankar
Jigyaasa (Remix) - Ram Shankar
Khatiya Toot Gayee Sonu Kakkar
Meethe Meethe Sapnon Mein - Sadhana Sargam
Saansein Meri Saansein - Rahul Vaidya
Saansein Meri Sansein (Breathless Mix) - Rahul Vaidya

Remake
The film was unofficially remade in 2014 in Marathi titled Nati which means Actress. However some scenes and dramatization were changed to avoid any legal hassles.

Criticism and legacy
The Lesbian interaction and kiss between Hrishitaa Bhatt and her co-actor in the film's scene was mentioned in an article from Spotboye.com by writer Chetna Kapoor as The Hottest Lesbian And Gay Kisses in Bollywood. Box Office Collection marked Jigyaasa and Madhur Bhandarkar's Heroine as better made films until date with Bollywood used as a backdrop.

References

External links 
 

2006 films
2000s Hindi-language films
Indian biographical films
Hindi films remade in other languages
2000s biographical films
Films directed by Faisal Saif